Acrocercops cherimoliae is a moth of the family Gracillariidae. It is known from the Democratic Republic of Congo.

The larvae feed on Annona cherimolia. They probably mine the leaves of their host plant.

References

cherimoliae
Moths described in 1940
Moths of Africa
Endemic fauna of the Democratic Republic of the Congo